FFKMs (by ASTM 1418 standard) (equivalent to FFPMs by ISO/DIN 1629 standard) are perfluoroelastomeric compounds containing an even higher amount of fluorine than FKM fluoroelastomers.

They have improved resistance to high temperatures  and chemicals and even withstand environments where Oxygen-Plasma are present for many hours. They are commonly used to make O-rings and gaskets that are used in applications that involve contact with hydrocarbons or highly corrosive fluids, or when a wide range of temperatures is encountered.

For vacuum applications, demanding very low contamination (out-gassing and particle emission) as well as high temperature operation (200–300 °C) for prolonged out-baking or processing times and where a copper or metal sealing is not possible or very inconvenient/expensive, a custom-made, clean-room manufactured, sealing such as Kalrez® 9100, SCVBR or Perlast can be used. After manufacturing, they are O-plasma vacuum cleaned (and/or vacuum baked) to reach out-gassing performance similar to Teflon while reaching vacuum leak tightness (permeability rates) similar to FKM (Viton) compounds. This combination of properties allows FFKM seals to reach well into UHV pressures without the use of metal sealing. However, they are significantly more expensive than standard FKM O-rings.

References

Organofluorides
Elastomers
Materials science
Fluoropolymers